George Periolat (February 5, 1874 – February 20, 1940) was an American actor.

Biography
Born in Chicago, Illinois, George Periolat began his career as a Broadway actor. Making his film debut with the Essanay Studios in Chicago, he moved to Hollywood in 1911 and starred in over 170 films throughout his career. He was a very versatile actor, often playing multiple roles in a single production, as when he played two leading characters, the count and the crook, in the 1916 production of The Counterfeit Earl. The story of Norma Desmond, though fictitious, is not far removed from the plight of many silent film stars, and the advent of the sound film brought about a swift end to Periolat's career. He made his last appearance in 1932's What Price Hollywood?. On February 20, 1940, he committed suicide by ingesting arsenic in his Hollywood mansion.

Outside his acting career, George Periolat was an amateur photographer, and a grandson of Clemens Periolat.

Filmography

1910s

 The Water War (1911)
 The Angel of Paradise Ranch (1911)
 From the Four Hundred to the Herd (1912)
 The Maid and the Man (1912)
 The Thread of Life (1912)
 The Evil Inheritance (1912) as The Father
 Where There's a Heart (1912) as The Prospector
 Her Own Country (1912)
 Nell of the Pampas (1912)
 Cupid Never Ages (1913)
 Calamity Anne's Beauty (1913)
 The Road to Ruin (1913)
 Oil on Troubled Waters (1913)
 Calamity Anne's Parcel Post (1913)
 The Wishing Seat (1913)
 Her Big Story (1913)
 A Husband's Mistake (1913)
 Quicksands (1913)
 Truth in the Wilderness (1913)
 The Scapegoat (1913)
 For the Flag (1913)
 For the Crown (1913)
 Calamity Anne, Heroine (1913)
 Travellers of the Road (1913)
 The Badge of Honor (1913)
 A Pitfall of the Installment Plan (1913)
 The Step Brothers (1913)
 The Restless Spirit (1913)
 In the Days of Trajan (1913)
 The Girl and the Greaser (1913)
 The Passerby (1913)
 The Tale of the Ticker (1913)
 The Barrier of Bars (1913)
 The Dread Inheritance (1913) as The Father
 Incognito (1913)
 Rory o' the Bogs (1913)
 The Field Foreman (1913)
 The Magic Skin (1914)
 The Man Who Lied (1914)
 The Man Between (1914)
 Hearts and Flowers (1914)
 The Acid Test (1914)
 Sealed Orders (1914)
 The Bolted Door (1914)
 The Lion (1914)
 Samson (1914) as Manoah, Samson's father
 As Fate Willed (1914)
 Toilers of the Sea (1914)
 The Call Back (1914)
 The Sheep Herder (1914)
 The Sandhill Lovers (1914) as Hardy, the Rustler
 A Twentieth Century Pirate (1914)
 At Mexico's Mercy (1914)
 Value Received (1914)
 Out of the Valley (1914)
 Man and His Brother (1914)
 There Is a Destiny (1914)
 Weight and Measures (1914)
 The Man from Nowhere (1914)
 Little Meg and I (1914)
 A Kentucky Gentleman (1914)
 The Proof of a Man (1914)
 Disillusioned (1914)
 His Father's Son (1914/I)
 His Heart His Hand and His Sword (1914)
 The Empire of Illusion (1914)
 The Inn of the Winged Gods (1914)
 The King and the Man (1914)
 A Bogus Bandit (1915)
 Smouldering Fires (1915)
 The Storm (1915)
 The Guardian of the Flock (1915)
 The Stool Pigeon (1915) as Oswald Trumble
 The Diamond from the Sky (1915) as Luke Lovell
 The Palace of Dust (1915)
 When a Queen Loved O'Rourke (1915)
 The Road to Paradise (1915) as Prince Vladislav
 Curly (1915)
 Viviana (1916)
 The Smugglers of Santa Cruz (1916)
 Life's Harmony (1916)
 The Silken Spider (1916)
 The Code of Honor (1916)
 Ways of the World (1916)
 The Wayfarers (1916)
 Realization (1916)
 The Counterfeit Earl (1916)
 The Touch on the Key (1916)
 Four Months (1916)
 Jealousy's First Wife (1916)
 The Gentle Conspiracy (1916)
 Tangled Skeins (1916)
 Killed by Whom? (1916)
 The Quicksands of Deceit (1916)
 The Dancer (1916)
 Pastures Green (1916)
 The Little Troubadour (1916)
 Enchantment (1916)
 The Atonement (1916)
 The Sable Blessing (1916) as Crow
 Philip Holden - Waster (1916) as Miles Holden
 And the Law Says (1916) as Dr. Cartmell
 The Valley of Decision (1916) as Dr. Brainard
 The Gentle Intruder (1917)
 The Gilded Youth (1917)
 Double Revenge (1917)
 Nature's Calling (1917)
 The Old Sheriff (1917)
 Environment (1917) as David Holcombe
 Annie-for-Spite (1917) as Andrew Walters
 Her Country's Call (1917) as Jim Slocum
 Periwinkle (1917) as Ephraiam Rawlins
 Melissa of the Hills (1917) as Cyrus Kimball
 Sands of Sacrifice (1917) as Enoch Foyle
 Southern Pride (1917) as James Morgan
 A Game of Wits (1917) as Cyrus Browning
 The Mate of the Sally Ann (1917) as Captain Ward
 Rosemary Climbs the Heights (1918) as Godfrey Van Voort
 Beauty and the Rogue (1918) as Thomas Lee
 Social Briars (1918) as Peter Andrews
 The Ghost of Rosy Taylor (1918) as Charles Eldridge/Joseph Sayles
 The Eyes of Julia Deep (1918) as Timothy Black
 Wives and Other Wives (1918) as Judge Corcoran
 The Amazing Impostor (1919) as Henry Hope
 Put Up Your Hands! (1919) as Peter Barton
 The Intrusion of Isabel (1919) as Henry Whitney
 Trixie from Broadway (1919) as Broadway Benham
 A Sporting Chance (1919) as Edward Craig
 The Tiger Lily (1919) as Luigi
 The Hellion (1919) as Signor Enrico
 Beckoning Roads (1919) as John Graysoon
 Eve in Exile (1919) as Jim Ricardo

1920s

 Judy of Rogue's Harbor (1920) as Peter Kingsland
 The Dangerous Talent (1920) as Peyton Dodge
 Nurse Marjorie (1920) as Andrew Danbury
 Parlor, Bedroom and Bath (1920) as Fred Leslie
 Life's Twist (1920) as Mr. Boyd Chester
 The Mark of Zorro (1920) as Gov. Alvarado
 Two Weeks with Pay (1921) as Ginsberg
 The Kiss (1921) as Don Luis Baldarama
 Who Am I? (1921) as John Collins
 They Shall Pay (1921) as Amos Colby
 Wealth (1921) as Irving Seaton
 Her Face Value (1921) as James R. Greenwood
 A Parisian Scandal (1921) as Count Louis Oudoff
 Shattered Idols (1922) as The High Priest
 Gay and Devilish (1922) as Nethercote
 Dust Flower (1922) as Ott
 Blood and Sand (1922) as Marquis of Guevera
 The Young Rajah (1922) as General Gadi
 The Tiger's Claw (1923) as Henry Frazer Halehurst
 The Barefoot Boy (1923) as Si Parker
 Rosita (1923) as Rosita's father
 Slave of Desire (1923) as The Duke
 The Yankee Consul (1924) as Don Rafael Desschado
 Lovers' Lane (1924) as Dr. Stone
 The Red Lily (1924) as Papa Bouchard
 The Girl on the Stairs (1925) as Dr. Bourget
 Any Woman (1925) as Robert Cartwright
 Fighting Youth (1925) as Judge Manley
 The Phantom Express (1925) as John Lane
 The Nutcracker (1926) as Señor Gómez
 Atta Boy (1926)
 In Search of a Hero (1926) as Frenchman
 Butterflies in the Rain (1926)
 The Mile-a-Minute Man (1926) as C.O. 'Old Ironsides' Rockett
 The Prairie King (1927) as Ramon Fernandez
 Speedy Smith (1927) as Charles C. Smith
 Through Thick and Thin (1927) as James Morris
 Fangs of Destiny (1927) as Colonel Shelby
 Alias the Deacon (1928)
 The Secret Hour (1928) as Doctor
 Black Butterflies (1928) as Hatch
 Night Watch (1928) as Fargasson
 When Dreams Come True (1929) as Robert Swayne
 The Fatal Warning (1929) as William Rogers
 One Splendid Hour (1929) as Senator Walsh

1930s
 Cracked Nuts (1931) as Royal Advisor (uncredited)
 What Price Hollywood? (1932) (uncredited)

External links

 

American male film actors
American male silent film actors
American male stage actors
Male actors from Chicago
1874 births
1940 deaths
Suicides in California
Suicides by poison
20th-century American male actors
1940 suicides